This uniform polyhedron compound is a composition of the 2 enantiomers of the great snub icosidodecahedron.

References 
.

Polyhedral compounds